Benjamin or Ben Bryant may refer to:

Benjamin Franklin Bryant (1800–1857), Republic of Texas captain
Benjamin Bryant (naval officer) (1905–1994), British WWII-era Royal Navy Rear Admiral
Benjamin Bryant (broadcaster) (born 1977), American writer, broadcaster, filmmaker; former civil servant
Ben Bryant (cricketer) (born 1994), Australian cricketer
Ben Bryant (American football), American football player